George Salier (1813 – 11 June 1892) was an Australian politician.

Salier was born in 1813. In 1866 he was elected to the Tasmanian House of Assembly, representing the seat of Hobart Town. He resigned in 1869, was re-elected in 1870 and transferred to the new seat of North Hobart in 1871. In 1886 he moved to the Tasmanian Legislative Council, representing the seat of Hobart until his death in Hobart in 1892.

References

1813 births
1892 deaths
Members of the Tasmanian House of Assembly
Members of the Tasmanian Legislative Council